

Events
John Giannola of "Green Ones gang" of East St Louis-died age 40 of natural Causes.
After losing his estate in Pelham Manor, New York, former mob leader Ciro Terranova returns to New York City.  On February 19, Terranova suffers a stroke and dies the following day.
Julius Richard "Dixie" Davis, longtime defense lawyer for Dutch Schultz, is imprisoned.  
May 2 – Detroit mobster Joe Tocco is shot in the back and dies the following day. His death was possibly connected to mobster Joseph Zerilli, who had been consolidating his power in Detroit since the end of Prohibition. 
August 21 – Hyman Yuran, a former associate of Louis "Lepke" Buchalter is killed by Murder, Inc.  His body is later found in a lime pit near the small town of Loch Sheldrake, New York.

Arts and literature
The Amazing Dr. Clitterhouse (film)  starring Edward G. Robinson and Humphrey Bogart.
Angels with Dirty Faces (film)  starring James Cagney, Pat O'Brien and Humphrey Bogart.
Racket Busters (film)  starring Humphrey Bogart.

Births
John E. Farrell "Fast Jack", Patriarca crime family associate
February 11 – Manuel Noriega, Panamanian military leader and drug trafficker
December 14 – Frank Cullotta, Chicago Outfit associate and Soldier in Las Vegas

Deaths

 January 5- John Ginnola of "Green Ones gang" of East St Louis
 February 20 – Ciro Terranova "The Artichoke King", Morello crime family leader 
 May 2 – Joe Tocco, Detroit mobster
 August 21 – Hyman Yuran, a former associate of Louis Buchalter

References 

Organized crime
Years in organized crime